Tyurinsky is a rural locality (a khutor) in Sulyayevskoye Rural Settlement, Kumylzhensky District, Volgograd Oblast, Russia. The population was 127 as of 2010. There are 3 streets.

Geography 
Tyurinsky is located in forest steppe, on Khopyorsko-Buzulukskaya Plain, on the bank of the Kumylga River, 23 km north of Kumylzhenskaya (the district's administrative centre) by road. Sulyayevsky is the nearest rural locality.

References 

Rural localities in Kumylzhensky District